Jamai may refer to:

Places
Jamai, India, a municipality in Chhindwara district in the Indian state of Madhya Pradesh

Persons
Given name
Jamai Loman, Dutch pop singer better known by his mononym Jamai and winner of Dutch Idol in 2003, the inaugural season in the Netherlands

Family name
Aboubakr Jamaï (born 1968) also known as Boubker, Moroccan journalist, banker and publisher

Others
Jamai Raja, 1990 Hindi comedy drama film 
Jamai Shashthi, 1931 Bengali film directed by Amar Choudhury
Adorer jamai, 2011 Bengali action comedy film
Ghar Jamai (disambiguation)